Series 28 of University Challenge ran between 2 September 1998 and 27 April 1999.

Results
 Winning teams are highlighted in bold.
 Teams with green scores (winners) returned in the next round, while those with red scores (losers) were eliminated.
 Teams with orange scores have lost, but survived as highest scoring losers.
 A score in italics indicates a match decided on a tie-breaker question.

First round

Highest Scoring Losers play-offs

Second round

Quarter-finals

Semi-finals

Final

 The trophy and title were awarded to the Open team comprising Lance Haward, David Good, John Burke and Sue Mitchell.
 The trophy was presented by Jeremy Paxman.
 Salman Rushdie had been due to present the trophy, but the recording of the semi-finals and final were postponed after Paxman fell ill, and he wasn't available for the rescheduled dates.

References

External links
 University Challenge Homepage
 Blanchflower Results Table

1998
1998 British television seasons
1999 British television seasons